Brenton LaJames "Brent" Petway (born May 12, 1985) is an American esports player of Panathinaikos eSports and a retired professional basketball player. Because of his leaping and dunking ability, he has been given the nickname "Air Georgia". This is similar to Vince Carter, who was nicknamed Air Canada, while playing for the Toronto Raptors.

Petway won the inaugural NBA D-League Slam Dunk Contest, at D-League Dream Factory Friday Night, on February 15, during the 2008 NBA All-Star Game Weekend. Petway defeated his Idaho Stampede teammate, Mike Taylor, in the finals, with an alley-oop, through-the-legs dunk. In October 2010, he became a member of the world-famous Harlem Globetrotters, under the name Thunder Petway.

High school career
Petway attended and played high school basketball at  Griffin High School for two years, where he won a state championship. He also played at Eagle's Landing High School for one year, and at Union Grove High School for one year.

College career
Petway played college basketball at the University of Michigan with the Michigan Wolverines, from 2003 to 2007.

With Michigan, he won the NIT Tournament championship in 2004. Petway averaged 5.8 points per game during his career at Michigan.

Professional career
Petway participated in training camp with the NBA team the Portland Trail Blazers in the fall of 2007. Petway played in the NBA D-League during the 2007–08 season with the Idaho Stampede, a development team for the Portland Trail Blazers and the Seattle SuperSonics. He played with the 2008 Memphis Grizzlies Summer League team, and then returned to the Stampede for the 2008–09 season.

He played on the Toronto Raptors Summer League team in 2009. He then moved to the Greek League club Ilysiakos. He joined the French League club JA Vichy in 2010. He then moved to the Greek League club Rethymno Aegean.

In June 2013, he joined the Greek EuroLeague team Olympiacos on a two-year deal.

On July 30, 2015, he signed a one-year deal with Dinamo Sassari.

On August 18, 2016, Petway signed a 1+1 contract with Turkish club Pınar Karşıyaka.

On August 17, 2017, Petway signed with Greek club Aris for the 2017–18 season. In December 2017, he parted ways with Aris. On January 15, 2018, he signed with Tuři Svitavy of Czech Republic.

Esports career
On April 2, 2020, Petway signed with Greek e-club Panathinaikos eSports.

Career statistics

EuroLeague

|-
| style="text-align:left;"| 2013–14
| style="text-align:left;"| Olympiacos
| 25 || 6 || 19.0 || .514 || .438 || .667 || 3.5 || .9 || .4 || 1.0 || 6.2 || 6.2
|-
| style="text-align:left;"| 2014–15
| style="text-align:left;"| Olympiacos
| 24 || 15 || 18.2 || .421 || .329 || .783 || 3.7 || 1.0 || .4 || .8 || 5.5 || 6.4
|-
| style="text-align:left;"| 2015–16
| style="text-align:left;"| Sassari
| 7 || 4 || 21.0 || .667 || .214 || .667 || 3.4 || .7 || .3 || .7 || 4.4 || 3.0
|- class="sortbottom"
| style="text-align:center;" colspan=2 | Career
| 56 || 25 || 18.9 || .625 || .364 || .723 || 3.6 || .9 || .4 || .9 || 5.7 || 6.1

Awards and accomplishments

College career
NIT Tournament Champion: (2004)

Pro career
NBA D-League All-Star Game Slam Dunk Champ: (2008)
NBA D-League Champion: (2008) 
NBA D-League Defensive Player of the Year: (2009)
Greek League All-Star Game: (2013)
Greek All-Star Game Slam Dunk Champion: (2013)
Greek League All-Star Game MVP: (2013)
Greek League Most Spectacular Player: (2013)
FIBA Intercontinental Cup Champion: (2013)
Greek League Champion: (2015)

References

External links
Brent Petway at espn.com
Brent Petway at euroleague.net
Brent Petway at fiba.com
Brent Petway at lnb.fr 

1985 births
Living people
American expatriate basketball people in the Czech Republic
American expatriate basketball people in France
American expatriate basketball people in Greece
American expatriate basketball people in Italy
American expatriate basketball people in Turkey
American men's basketball players
Aris B.C. players
Basketball players from Georgia (U.S. state)
Dinamo Sassari players
Greek Basket League players
Harlem Globetrotters players
Idaho Stampede players
Ilysiakos B.C. players
JA Vichy players
Karşıyaka basketball players
Michigan Wolverines men's basketball players
Olympiacos B.C. players
Power forwards (basketball)
Rethymno B.C. players
Tuři Svitavy players
American esports players
NBA 2K players
Panathinaikos eSports players